Saltcoats is a town in North Ayrshire, Scotland.

Saltcoats may also refer to:

 in Canada:
 Rural Municipality of Saltcoats No. 213, Saskatchewan
 Saltcoats, Saskatchewan, a community of Saskatchewan
 Saltcoats (electoral district), a former federal electoral district in Saskatchewan
 Saltcoats (provincial electoral district), a former provincial electoral district in Saskatchewan

 in the United Kingdom:
 Saltcoats, North Ayrshire, Scotland
 Saltcoats, Cumbria, England
 Saltcoats, East Lothian, Scotland, Saltcoats Castle is nearby